Baby Ballroom is an English-language dance reality-TV series about a dance school, the Zig Zag Dance Factory in Wolverhampton, England. The school is run by Warren Bullock and his wife Jane, former ballroom dance champions, and the show focuses on the many couples that Warren and Jane train.

Cast
 Kim Hillyard
 Jane Bullock
 Warren Bullock

Release
It was released on April 27, 2017 on Netflix streaming.

References

External links
 
 Zig Zag Dance Website

2010s British reality television series
English-language television shows